Mónica Fernández Balboa (born 4 July 1966) is a Mexican architect and politician from the National Regeneration Movement, serving as a Senator in the LXIV Legislature of the Mexican Congress from Tabasco. From September 1, 2019 to August 31, 2020 she served as President of the Senate. As a member of the Party of the Democratic Revolution, from 2006 to 2009, she served as a federal deputy in the LX Legislature.

Since September 1, 2019, Fernandez Balboa has been President of the Senate. She was elected to the Presidency of the Senate with 110 votes in favor, one against, and two abstentions.

References

1951 births
Living people
Politicians from Tabasco
Women members of the Chamber of Deputies (Mexico)
Members of the Chamber of Deputies (Mexico) for Tabasco
Morena (political party) politicians
21st-century Mexican politicians
21st-century Mexican women politicians
Universidad Autónoma de Guadalajara alumni
Women legislative speakers
Members of the Senate of the Republic (Mexico) for Tabasco
Deputies of the LX Legislature of Mexico
Women members of the Senate of the Republic (Mexico)